Genesis are an English progressive rock band from Godalming, Surrey. Formed in January 1967, the group originally consisted of lead vocalist and flautist Peter Gabriel, guitarist Anthony Phillips, bassist and guitarist Mike Rutherford, keyboardist Tony Banks and drummer Chris Stewart. The band's most recent lineup featured constant members Rutherford and Banks, alongside drummer and vocalist Phil Collins (who first joined in 1970), augmented for live shows by touring musicians, bassist and guitarist Daryl Stuermer, drummer Nic Collins and backing vocalists Daniel Pearce and Patrick Smyth.

History

1967–1971
Following the breakup of earlier groups Garden Wall and Anon, Genesis were formed in January 1967 by Peter Gabriel, Tony Banks, Chris Stewart (all from Garden Wall), Anthony Phillips and Mike Rutherford (both from Anon). The group recorded their first single "The Silent Sun" in December, which was released the following February. "A Winter's Tale" followed three months later. Shortly after the release of the second single, Stewart had to leave when his parents refused to let him leave school to focus on the band. He was soon replaced by fellow student John Silver.

Over a ten-day period during the school summer holidays in August 1968, Genesis recorded their debut album From Genesis to Revelation, which was released in March 1969. By August, John Mayhew had replaced Silver, who had moved to the United States to study at Cornell University. Between June and July 1970, the group recorded their second album Trespass, although before its release Phillips announced that he would be departing due to stage fright and other health issues. The remaining members decided to continue, although without Mayhew who was fired.

After advertising for the vacant positions in Melody Maker magazine, Genesis hired Phil Collins as Mayhew's replacement in August 1970. Before bringing in a replacement for Phillips, the group performed for a couple of months as a four-piece without a guitarist. The position was eventually filled temporarily by Mick Barnard starting in November. By January 1971, Barnard had been replaced by former Quiet World guitarist Steve Hackett.

1971–1977
The lineup of Peter Gabriel, Steve Hackett, Mike Rutherford, Tony Banks and Phil Collins remained stable for four years, issuing the albums Nursery Cryme in 1971, Foxtrot in 1972, Genesis Live and Selling England by the Pound in 1973, and The Lamb Lies Down on Broadway in 1974. Gabriel left at the end of the Lamb Lies Down on Broadway Tour in May 1975, although his departure was not officially announced until 15 August 1975.

Genesis auditioned several potential replacements for Gabriel and even briefly considered continuing as an instrumental group, before Collins eventually started performing lead vocals for their next album A Trick of the Tail and took on the role full-time. To allow him to focus on performing vocals, drums on the Trick of the Tail Tour were performed by Bill Bruford. In December 1976, it was announced that Bruford had been replaced by Chester Thompson. However, Collins continued to play the drums on all of the band's studio recordings and he continued to play drums in concert for certain songs, including extended instrumental sections, and he often played percussion onstage while singing.

Following the Wind & Wuthering Tour, it was announced in October 1977 that Hackett had left Genesis to pursue a solo career. Prior to the announcement, Collins, Rutherford and Banks had already recorded the group's next album ...And Then There Were Three..., which was issued in March 1978. After Hackett's departure, Daryl Stuermer joined Thompson as a member of the Genesis touring band, performing guitars, bass and backing vocals.

1977–present
The Banks/Collins/Rutherford (with Stuermer/Thompson) lineup of Genesis remained constant for almost 20 years. The We Can't Dance Tour of 1992 was the final run to feature this setup, as the band took a break thereafter. On 18 September 1993, the trio of Collins, Rutherford and Banks performed at a fundraising event with Tim Renwick on bass, and Gary Wallis and Roger Taylor on drums. Genesis spent the next couple of years on hiatus, before it was announced on 28 March 1996 that Collins had left the band, although Rutherford and Banks assured that they would continue after hiring a new vocalist.

By November 1996, Ray Wilson had been appointed as the replacement for Collins in time for the recording of Calling All Stations, although his addition was not announced until the following June. For the subsequent touring cycle, the new trio were joined by guitarist Anthony Drennan and drummer Nir Zidkyahu. The tour ended in 1998, and by 2000 the group had disbanded.

Six years later, Collins, Rutherford and Banks announced at a press conference in November 2006 that Genesis were reforming for a European tour the following year. The tour, dubbed Turn It On Again, was subsequently expanded to include a North American run of concerts. Alongside the main trio, it also saw the return of touring guitarist/bassist Daryl Stuermer and drummer Chester Thompson. The 2007 concert tour spawned the live album Live over Europe 2007 and the live DVD When in Rome 2007. Turn It On Again: The Tour ended with a show in Hollywood, California on 13 October 2007.

A second reformation, the Last Domino? Tour, was announced on 4 March 2020, 13 years after the previous tour. Stuermer returned, alongside Collins's son Nic on drums.

Members

Current members

Former members

Touring

Timeline

Touring musicians timeline

Lineups

References

External links
Genesis official website

Genesis